Heinrich Friedrich von Arnim-Heinrichsdorff-Werbelow (born 23 September 1791 in Werbelow/Uckermark; died 18 April 1859 in Berlin) was a Prussian statesman.

Arnim participated in the War of the Sixth Coalition and then embarked on a diplomatic career. After working as legation secretary in Stockholm and in Paris, he was the Prussian envoy in Brussels from 1831, from 1841 in Paris and in Vienna from 1845 to 1848, where he acted entirely in accordance with Metternich's politics. He became an important advisor to king  Frederick William IV of Prussia during the revolution of 1848 . He encouraged the King to grant concessions to liberals and support German unification under Prussian leadership. On 24 February 1849 he was appointed Foreign Minister of Prussia, And pursued a revolutionary foreign policy, reversing ties with the reactionary states of Russia and Austria. He sought with little success to gain French and British support for the creation of the German national state, and for the restoration of Polish independence. He resigned  on 3 May, 1849, as he did not agree with the German policy of the foreign ministry. From 1851 to 1857 he was once again Prussian ambassador to Vienna, he cultivated good relations with Austria as much as possible, which he saw as an indispensable ally of Prussia. He died on 18 April 1859. Arnim was not married.

References

1791 births
1859 deaths
Ambassadors of Prussia
Prussian politicians
Members of the Prussian House of Lords
19th-century diplomats
Foreign ministers of Prussia
Heinrich Friedrich
Prussian Army personnel of the Napoleonic Wars